William Plumer (June 25, 1759December 22, 1850) was an American lawyer, Baptist lay preacher, and politician from Epping, New Hampshire. He is most notable for his service as a Federalist in the United States Senate (1802–1807), and the seventh governor of New Hampshire as a Democratic-Republican (1812–1813, 1816–1819).

Early life
Plumer was born in Newburyport, Province of Massachusetts Bay on June 25, 1759, the son of farmer and merchant Samuel Plumer and Mary (Dole) Plumer. His family moved to Epping, New Hampshire in 1768, and he was raised at his father's farm on Epping's Red Oak Hill. Plumer attended the Red Oak Hill School until he was 17.

Frequent ill health left him unsuited for military service during the American Revolution or life as a farmer, and after a religious conversion experience in his late teens, Plumer was trained as a Baptist exhorter (a lay preacher). For several years he traveled throughout the state to deliver sermons to Baptist churches and revival meetings. He briefly considered a career as a doctor, and began to study medicine. Later deciding on a legal career, he studied law with attorneys Joshua Atherton of Amherst and John Prentice of Londonderry. While studying under Atherton, his fellow law clerks included William Coleman, who remained a lifelong friend. Plumer attained admission to the bar in 1787, and began to practice in Epping.

Early career
In addition to practicing law, Plumer was active in local politics and government. He held several town offices, including selectman. Plumer served in the New Hampshire House of Representatives from 1785 to 1786, in 1788, from 1790 to 1791, and from 1797 to 1800. In 1791 and 1797 he served as Speaker of the House. Plumer was a delegate to the state constitutional convention of 1791-1792.

US Senate
Plumer was elected to the US Senate as a Federalist and filled the vacancy caused by the resignation of James Sheafe. Plumer served from June 17, 1802 to March 3, 1807 and was not a candidate for re-election.

In 1803, Plumer was one of several New England Federalists to propose secession from the United States because of the lack of
power by Federalists, the rising influence of Jeffersonian Democrats, and the diminished influence of the North since the Louisiana Purchase. Recalling his involvement in the secession scheme in 1827, Plumer said, "This was, I think, the greatest political error of my life: & would, had it been reduced to practise [sic], instead of releiving [sic], destroyed New England.... Fortunately for my own reputation the erroneous opinion I formed produced no bitter fruits to myself or my country."

New Hampshire Senate
Plumer served in the New Hampshire Senate in 1810 and 1811, and was chosen in both years to serve as the Senate's president.

Governor
By now a Democratic-Republican, in 1812, Plumer was the party's successful nominee for Governor of New Hampshire, and he served until 1813.  He returned to office in 1816, and served until 1819.

Presidential elector, 1820
In the 1820 presidential election, Plumer was one of New Hampshire's electoral college members. He cast the only dissenting vote in the Electoral College against incumbent President James Monroe, voting instead for John Quincy Adams. Some accounts say that it was to ensure that George Washington remained the only US president to be unanimously chosen by the Electoral College, but others assert that he was instead calling attention to his friend Adams as a potential future presidential candidate or was protesting against the "wasteful extravagance" of the Monroe administration. Plumer also eschewed voting for Daniel D. Tompkins for Vice President as "grossly intemperate" and having "not that weight of character which his office requires" and "because he grossly neglected his duty" in his "only" official role as president of the Senate by being "absent nearly three-fourths of the time." Plumer instead voted for Richard Rush.

Other activities

Plumer was a founder and the first president of the New Hampshire Historical Society.  He was elected a member of the American Antiquarian Society in 1815.

Death and burial
Plumer died in Epping on December 22, 1850 and was buried at the Plumer Family Cemetery in Epping.

Family

In 1788, Plumer married Sarah "Sally" Fowler of Newmarket, New Hampshire. They were the parents of six children—William, Sally, Samuel, George Washington, John Jay, and Quintus. William Plumer Jr. was an author and attorney who served in the United States House of Representatives from 1819 to 1825.

See also
 Paper Money Riot

References

External links

 
 
 A New Nation Votes: American Election Returns, 1787–1825

 
 William Plumer at National Governors Association
 Memoir of William Plumer, Senior, by Albert Harrison Hoyt.  1871.

1759 births
1850 deaths
18th-century American politicians
19th-century American politicians
Politicians from Newburyport, Massachusetts
People from Epping, New Hampshire
Baptists from New Hampshire
New Hampshire Federalists
New Hampshire Democratic-Republicans
Members of the New Hampshire House of Representatives
New Hampshire state senators
Governors of New Hampshire
Faithless electors
United States senators from New Hampshire
Federalist Party United States senators
Writers from Newburyport, Massachusetts
Writers from New Hampshire
Democratic-Republican Party state governors of the United States
Members of the American Antiquarian Society
People of colonial Massachusetts
1820 United States presidential electors
Baptist ministers from the United States
Baptists from Massachusetts